Rati Urushadze (born Tbilisi, 22 September 1975) is a Georgian rugby union player. He plays as a lock and as a flanker.

He moved to France, where he played for Nice, in 2006/07, in the Fédérale 2, and for Lons-le-Saunier, in 2007/08, in the Fédérale 1. He played for Enisey STM-Krasnoyark, for 2012/13, in the Russian League. He is playing for RC Kochebi Bolnisi, in Georgia Championship for 2013/14 season.

He had 41 caps for Georgia, from 1997 to 2009, scoring 5 tries, 25 points on aggregate. He was called for the 2007 Rugby World Cup, playing in three games and remaining scoreless.

References

External links
Rati Urushadze International Statistics

1975 births
Living people
Rugby union players from Georgia (country)
Rugby union locks
Rugby union flankers
Georgia international rugby union players
Rugby union players from Tbilisi